James W. Nuttall (born 1953) is a retired United States Army major general who served as deputy director of the Army National Guard and deputy commander of the United States First Army.

Early life
Nuttall was born in Smithfield, Rhode Island in 1953.  He graduated from Smithfield High School in 1971.

Start of military career
Nuttall enlisted in the Rhode Island National Guard in 1971.  In 1975 he graduated from Officer Candidate School and received his commission as a second lieutenant of Artillery.

Nuttall completed several command and staff assignments in Rhode Island, including: commander, A Battery, 2nd Battalion, 103rd Field Artillery Regiment (1980–1982); commander, 1st Battalion, 103rd Field Artillery Regiment (1995–1996); and commander, 103rd Field Artillery Brigade (1997–2000).

In August 2000 Nuttall began several assignments outside Rhode Island, including: deputy assistant commandant - Army National Guard, United States Army Field Artillery School (2000–2002); assistant chief of staff - Army National Guard, Headquarters, United States Army Training and Doctrine Command (2002–2003); and chief of staff, Army National Guard, Army National Guard Readiness Center (2003–2004).

Later military career
In November, 2004 Nuttall was promoted to brigadier general and assigned as deputy director for operations, readiness and mobilization in the office of the Army’s Deputy Chief of Staff for Operations (G 3/5/7).

In July, 2006 he was assigned as deputy director of the Army National Guard.  He was promoted to major general in 2007.

In June, 2009 Nuttall was appointed as deputy commanding general - Army National Guard for the United States First Army.  He served in this position until retiring in 2011.

Civilian career
Prior to beginning assignments outside Rhode Island in 2000, Nuttall lived in the Providence, Rhode Island area and worked as a Division I baseball umpire for the Eastern College Athletic Conference.

Since retiring from the military, Nuttall has again worked as a college baseball umpire.

Education
Nutall completed the Field Artillery Officer Basic and Advanced Courses and is a 1988 graduate of the United States Army Command and General Staff College.

In 1991 Nuttall completed a Bachelor of Science degree in Business Administration at Roger Williams University.  He completed a Master of Arts degree in International Relations at Salve Regina University in 1995.

Nuttall is a 1997 graduate of the United States Army War College.  In 2009 he completed the CAPSTONE course at the National Defense University.

Awards
Army Distinguished Service Medal
Legion of Merit (with Bronze Oak Leaf Cluster)
Meritorious Service Medal (with 3 Bronze Oak Leaf Clusters)
Army Commendation Medal (with 1 Bronze Oak Leaf Cluster)
Army Achievement Medal
Army Reserve Components Achievement Medal (with 2 Bronze Oak Leaf Clusters)
National Defense Service Medal (with Bronze Service Star)
Global War on Terrorism Service Medal
Armed Forces Service Medal
Humanitarian Service Medal
Armed Forces Reserve Medal (with Gold Hourglass)
Army Service Ribbon
Army Reserve Components Overseas Training Ribbon (with Numeral 3)
Air Assault Badge
Aircrew Badge
Army Staff Identification Badge
Army Superior Unit Award (with one Bronze Oak Leaf Cluster)

Additional awards
Nuttall is a 2011 recipient of the National Infantry Association's Order of Saint Maurice (Primicerius).

Effective dates of promotions
Major general, August 2, 2007
Brigadier general, November 8, 2004
Colonel, September 2, 1997
Lieutenant colonel, July 15, 1991
Major, December 16, 1985
Captain, January 14, 1980
First lieutenant, August 10, 1978
Second lieutenant, August 11, 1975

Chronological list of assignments
 August 1975 – January 1976, ammunition officer, Headquarters and Headquarters Battery, 2nd Battalion, 103rd Field Artillery, Providence, Rhode Island
 January 1976 – April 1976, student, Field Artillery Officer Basic Course, United States Army Field Artillery School, Fort Sill, Oklahoma
 May 1976 – October 1978, reconnaissance/survey officer, Headquarters and Headquarters Battery, 1st Battalion, 103rd Field Artillery, Providence, Rhode Island
 November 1978 – June 1980, personnel officer/S-1, 2nd Battalion, 103rd Field Artillery, Providence, Rhode Island
 July 1980 - March 1982, commander, Alpha Battery, 2nd Battalion, 103rd Field Artillery, Providence, Rhode Island
 March 1982 – November 1983, intelligence officer/S-2, 1st Battalion, 103rd Field Artillery, Providence, Rhode Island 
 December 1983 – December 1984, personnel officer/S-1 1st Battalion, 103rd Field Artillery, Providence, Rhode Island
 January 1985 – November 1985, assistant operations officer/S-3, 1st Battalion 103rd Field Artillery, Providence, Rhode Island 
 November 1985 – July 1988, operations officer/S-3, 1st Battalion, 103rd Field Artillery, Providence, Rhode Island 
 August 1988 – December 1988, student, Command and General Staff College, Fort Leavenworth, Kansas
 January 1989 – April 1990, executive officer, 2nd Battalion, 103rd Field Artillery, Providence, Rhode Island
 May 1990 – January 1991, executive officer, 1st Battalion, 103rd Field Artillery, Providence, Rhode Island 
 January 1991 – April 1991, force integration readiness officer, Headquarters, Rhode Island State Area Command, Rhode Island Army National Guard, Providence, Rhode Island 
 April 1991 – August 1992, mobilization plans officer, Headquarters, Rhode Island State Area Command, Rhode Island Army National Guard, Providence, Rhode Island
 September 1992 – July 1993, chief, plans, operations and military support officer, State Area Command, Rhode Island Army National Guard, Providence, Rhode Island 
 July 1993 – December 1994, operations officer/S-3, 103rd Field Artillery Brigade, Providence, Rhode Island
 January 1995 – July 1996, commander, 1st Battalion, 103rd Field Artillery, Providence, Rhode Island
 July 1996 – May 1997, director of surface maintenance, Rhode Island Army National Guard, Providence, Rhode Island 
 May 1997 – August 1997, executive officer, 103rd Field Artillery Brigade, Providence, Rhode Island
 August 1997 – July, 2000, commander, 103rd Field Artillery Brigade, Providence Rhode Island
 August 2000 – June 2002, deputy assistant commandant-Army National Guard, United States Army Field Artillery School, Fort Sill, Oklahoma
 June 2002 – March 2003, assistant chief of staff-Army National Guard, Headquarters, United States Army Training Doctrine Command, Fort Monroe, Virginia
 March 2003 – November 2004, chief of staff, Army National Guard, Army National Guard Readiness Center, Arlington, Virginia
 November 2004 – July 2006, deputy director for operations, readiness and mobilization, United States Army G-3/5/7, Washington, D.C.
 July 2006 – May 2009, deputy director, Army National Guard, Arlington Hall, Arlington, Virginia
 June 2009 – June 2011, deputy commanding general, Army National Guard, Headquarters, First Army, Fort Gillem, Forest Park, Georgia

References

External resources

James W. Nuttall at National Guard Bureau, General Officer Management Office

Living people
1953 births
People from Providence, Rhode Island
Roger Williams University alumni
Salve Regina University alumni
United States Army Command and General Staff College alumni
United States Army War College alumni
Recipients of the Distinguished Service Medal (US Army)
Recipients of the Legion of Merit
United States Army generals
National Guard (United States) generals